The boys' 10 kilometre classical cross-country skiing competition at the 2012 Winter Youth Olympics was held on 17 January at the Seefeld Arena.

Results
The race was started at 11:45.

References

Boys' 10 kilometre classical